The Middlewich Folk and Boat Festival takes place in June in Middlewich, Cheshire, England. The festival builds on the town's industrial heritage in which canal boats were used to move coal and other raw materials in the town for the production of salt, and then move the salt out of town, either for use directly, or as a raw material in the manufacture of chemicals such as chlorine and soda ash.

The Middlewich Folk and Boat festival is now firmly established on the folk circuit and it is estimated that 30,000 people visit the town during the festival weekend, along with 400 boats.  The festival was originally organised by members of the Middlewich Paddies, and taken over by the local council in 2011 when the original committee were unable to continue with the event.  In 2008, the festival was declared among the top three folk festivals in England by Guardian Online.

History
The festival has been held since 1990.  It was cancelled in 2001 because of Foot and Mouth disease.

The festival
Since 1990 there has been an annual folk music and (canal) boat festival, which is now highly regarded on the folk circuit with visitors coming into the town from all over the UK.  During this festival artists appear at venues throughout the town, whilst Morris Dancing and Craft Stalls also featured. The boating festival centres on the Trent and Mersey Canal. The main venues where people and boats converge are the Big Lock and Kings Lock, public houses next to locks of the same name on the Trent and Mersey canal.

Artistes

2014 (13–15 June) 

Ade Edmondson & The Bad Shepherds
The Men They Couldn't Hang
Hat Fitz & Cara
Phillip Henry & Hannah Martin
The Liverpool Shanty Kings
The Peace Artistes
Emma Stevens
Brian McCombe Band
Merry Hell
Moulettes
Headsticks
Allan Yn Y Fan
Niamh Boadle
NE3Folk
Jaipur Kawa Brass Band
Les Barker
Sean Taylor
Simply Soweto Encha
The Driving Force
Pamela Wyn-Shannon
Shamus O'Blivion and the Megadeath Morrismen
Thrill Collins

2013 (14–16 June) 

Dick Gaughan
Spiers & Boden
Greg Russell & Ciaran Algar
Seth Lakeman
Mark Radcliffe & Foes
Woody Mann
African Entsha
All Blacked Up Ceilidh Band
Babajack
The Backyard Devils
Blue Horyzon
The Boat Band
Clutching at Straws
Fosbrooks
Gordie MacKeeman & His Rhythm Boys
Golty Farabeau
Headsticks
Kye Sones
The Liverpool Shanty Kings
Maddocks & Bayes
Moulettes
NE3FOLK
The Peace Artistes
My Sweet Patootie
The Roving Crows
Dan Walsh & Christi Andropolis
The Willows

2012 (15–17 June)

Including
Show of Hands
Mark Radcliffe & the Big Figures
All Blacked Up
Les Barker
Merry Hell
Toy Hearts
Babajack
Roving Crows
Eddi Reader
Glenn Tilbrook
The BlueYellows

2011 (17–19 June)

Phil Maddocks
Pilgrims' Way
Andy Buckley
Salty Dog
The Tow Path Tipplers
The Crazy Folk Band
Sniggleheap
Acoustak
David Gibb and the Pony Club
Steamhead and the Weavils
Calico Jack
Last Ones Out
The Boat Band
Wearside Jack
Maxine Adelle
Louisa James
The Kane Sisters
Edel Fox
Hayley Strangelove
Dai Thomas
The Middlewich Paddies
With Bob On Our Side
The Generation
No Dinosaurs
Blackfingers
Providence Jug Band
Stan's Magic Foot
Steven Doyle

2010 (18–20 June) - 20th Anniversary Celebration

INCLUDING
Stan's Magic Foot
London Philharmonic Skiffle Orchestra
Mabon
Little Johnny England
The Lonnie Doneghan Band
Ken Nicol and Phil Cool
Nigel Beck
Queensbury Rules
Show of Hands
Pete Donegan
Tom Palmer
Peter Knight's Gigspanner

2009 (19–21 June)

The Family Mahone
Blue Murder
Ade Edmondson & The Bad Shepherds
All Blacked Up & Baz Parkes
Thea Gilmore
Jim Moray
Stan's Magic Foot
The Rainbow Chasers
Gina Le Faux
Tom Doughty
Greg Cave & The Village Band
Ella Edmondson
Vicki & Trefor
Andrea Glass
Rachel Harrington
Liz and the Lizzettes
Isambarde
Zoox
Acoustak
Barron Brady
Bill Malkin
Breeze and Wilson
Brendan Fahy
Calico Jack
Chloë
Chris Layhe and Oyster
Cold Flame
Dave Dove
Deportees
Dominic Collins
Dr Bob and the Wildboys
Fiona Simpson and Brian Adams
Full House
Geoff Mather
Guitar Mal
Holy Maggots
James & the Giant
Jaywalkers
Jonathan Tarplee
JP Slidewell
Kavona
Last Ones Out
Lorelei Loveridge
Lost in the Mist
Madcap
Men in Black
Michelle Martin
Nigel Beck
Peter Butler
Picnic Area
Providence Jug Band
Salt Town Poets
Shake the Barley
Song & Story
The Huers
Thom Kirkpatrick
Time Bandits

2008 (13–15 June)
Including

June Tabor
The Family Mahone
Martin Simpson
Bandersnatch
Kerfuffle
Peatbog Faeries
Nick Barraclough and the Burglars
Lau
Rory Ellis
Zoe Mulford
The Warsaw Village Band
Stomp
Nick Harper
Jonathan Kelly

2007 (15–17 June)
Seth Lakeman
Elbow Jane and Dave Dove
The Family Mahone with Mark Radcliffe
Dave Hunt and Happenstance.
Blazin’ Fiddles
Queensberry Rules
Ashley Hutchings and Rainbow Chasers
The Demon Barber Roadshow
Breeze & Wilson
Full House
Peeping Tom and caller Mick Peat.
The New Rope String Band
Richard Digance
Show of Hands
De Develeski
PJ Wright and Thom Kirkpatrick

2006 (16–18 June)
The Stereo Graffiti Show with Darren Poyzer and Friends
Tommy Kirkpatrick and the Beautiful Noise
The Dylan Project
Tom Doughty
PJ Wright and Dave Pegg
Karine Polwart
CrossCurrent
Michael McGoldrick and His Band
Emma and The Professor
Hazel O'Connor
A Woman's Word
McDermott's
The Levellers
The Family Mahone
Darren Poyzer
Ann English
Kirsty McGee
Dear Gregory
All Blacked Up
Cave
Martin Eden and The Assembly Boys

2005 (17–19 June)
Queensberry Rules
Uiscedwr
The Family Mahone
Mostly Autumn
Bellowhead
Jez Lowe and the Bad Pennies
Kerfuffle
Martin Carthy
Eddi Reader
Tickled Pink
Brian Kennedy
Eliza Carthy
The Ratcatchers

2004 (18–20 June)
Fairport Convention
The Family Mahone
Simon Mayor
Hilary James
Shooglenifty
Baker's Fabulous Boys
Show of Hands
The Levellers

2003 (13–15 June)
Bob Geldof
The Family Mahone
John Wright, Gary Forrest and Serious Kitchen
Whapweasel
Gordon Potts
The New John Wright Band
Ian Bruce
Kirsty McGee
Te Vaka
Rick Roser
Waterson–Carthy
Les Barker
Jim Moray
The Oysterband
Eliza Carthy Band
Sean Cannon

2002 (14–16 June)
Fairport Convention
Lindisfarne
Kate Rusby
Black Umfolosi
Andy Cutting and Chris Wood
Isla St Clair
e2k
Cara Dillon
Kathryn Robert and Sean Lakeman
Jon Boden and John Spiers
Whorticulture
Jenny Butterworth
Jon Brindley
Emily Slade
Hot Tamales
Aphrodite
Jug O' Punch
Steamhead
Taggart and Wright
Trefor and Vicki Williams
Roam
Quartz
Ailsa and John Booth
Brass Tacks
The Family Mahone
The Peace Artistes
Root Chord
Odd at Ease
Tom Brown and Ian Goodier
South Cheshire Pipe Band
Elle Osbourne
Sarah Hayes
The Middlewich Paddies

2001 (15–17 June – cancelled)
Cancelled due to Foot-and-mouth disease.

2000 (16–18 June)
Vin Garbutt
Iron Horse
Te Vaka
Roy Bailey and John Kirkpatrick
Blue Horses
Show of Hands
Les Barker
Blowzabella
Loctup Together
Jenny Butterworth
Cuckoo Oak
Seize the Day
Dragonfall
The Family Mahone
Slip Jig
Karen Burton
Tania Opland and Mike Freeman
Bob Webb
Calico Jack
Steamhead
Bakers Fabulous Boys
Ceolta
The National Youth Folklore Troupe of England
John Barden
Roy Clinging
Davian Reel
Quartz
St Patrick's Pipe Band
The Middlewich Paddies

1999 (18–20 June)
Cherish the Ladies
Black Umfolosi
The Poozies
Tanglefoot
The Old Rope String Band
Cock and Bull
The Oldham Tinkers
Bernard Wrigley
Ian Bruce
The Boat Band
Acquiesce
The Middlewich Paddies
The Chipolatas
St. Patrick's Pipe Band
Keeper's Lock
Steamhead
Davian Reel
Roy Wilcock & Bridget Guest
Lorebreakers

1998 (19–21 June)
Dervish
The Albion Band
Chris While and Julie Matthews
Artisan
Tanglefoot
Huw and Tony Williams
Cock and Bull Band
The Peace Artists
Calico Jack
Davian Reel
Moorland Folk
Buzz & Sam Collins
Stanley Accrington
The Middlewich Paddies
Chris Sherburn and Denny Bartley
Flakey Jake and The Steamin Locos
John Conolly and Pete Sumner
Fiona Shirra
Acquiesce
The Salt Town Poets
Ian Goodier and Tom Browne
Steamhead
Roy Wilcock and Bridget Guest
The Lorebreakers
Biggles Wartime Jug Band
The Ram Shanty Crew
Silk Brass

1997 (20–22 June)
The Yetties
Coope Boyes and Simpson
Big Jig
The Boat Band
Anam - Flook!
The Geckoes
Jez Lowe and The Bad Pennies
Crook
Sears and Harrison
Davian Reel
Gavin Lewery and Jock Tyldesley
Les Barker
To Hell with Burgundy
The Middlewich Paddies
Calico Jack
Youthquake
Salt Town Poets
The Chipolatas
Gilly Darby
Chew the Roots
Harvey Andrews

1996 (14–16 June)
After Hours
Cosmotheka
Calico Jack
Gary and Vera Aspey
Five Speed Box
New Bushbury Mountain Daredevils
Chris Sherbourn and Denny Bartley
The Southgators
Keith Donnelly
Risky Business
The Middlewich Paddies
Jenny Shotliffe and Youthquake
The Great Bonzo and Doris
Dave Roberts
Circus Sensible
Paul and Glen Elliot

Notes

External links
 http://www.midfest.org.uk/
 http://www.efestivals.co.uk/festivals/middlewich/2014 2014 Festival page
 http://www.users.zetnet.co.uk/gsivills/gsfandb.html 2003 Festival home page
 https://www.youtube.com/watch?v=g0O3VKl1OHA Clerical Error at the 2006 festival
 https://www.youtube.com/watch?v=HC2KTAv0owo Music at the Big Lock during the 2007 festival

Music festivals established in 1990
Folk festivals in the United Kingdom
Music festivals in Cheshire
Folk and Boat
Boat festivals